Desulfocella halophila is a halophilic bacterium from the genus of Desulfocella which has been isolated from sediments from the Great Salt Lake in the United States.

References

External links 
Type strain of Desulfocella halophila at BacDive -  the Bacterial Diversity Metadatabase

Desulfobacterales
Bacteria described in 1999
Halophiles